Han Sanping (born 1 October 1953) is a Chinese film producer and distributor. Until 2014, he served as the chairman of the state-owned China Film Group Corporation, which is one of the largest distributors and exporters of Chinese films. Caixin reported that Han retired from his state position shortly after being questioned during the anti-graft investigation into Zhou Yongkang, a high-level official in the Chinese Communist Party. Han has also co-produced with established film directors such as Peter Chan, Chen Kaige, Stephen Chow and Johnnie To. Han is currently a co-head of Zhengfu Pictures.

Apart from being the former chairman of China Film Group Corporation, Han also serves as the President of Beijing Film Studio and the Chinese Children Film Studio, as well as Vice Managing Director of the Chinese Film Producer Association.

In 2009 and 2011 he directed two patriotic tribute films: The Founding of a Republic for the 60th anniversary of the People's Republic of China, and The Founding of a Party for the 90th anniversary of the Chinese Communist Party. Both films featured cameos by famous actors and other film industry figures. He also produced the 2020 hit web series The Bad Kids.

References

External links
 

Chinese film producers
Living people
1953 births
People from Guangyuan